James P. Carley is a Canadian historian of English history and bibliographer, currently a Distinguished Research Professor at York University and a Fellow of the Royal Society of Canada. He specializes in the history and provenance of medieval English manuscripts and the early Tudor period.

He has written about the history of Glastonbury Abbey, Tudor antiquary John Leland, sixteenth-century book culture, the foundation and early history of Lambeth Palace Library, as well as on the Arthurian legends, and the modern British novelist Lawrence Durrell.

In August 2019, Carley became the first Canadian to receive the Bibliographical Society Gold Medal from the Bibliographical Society.

Education 
Carley received his B.A. in English from the University of Victoria, his M.A. in English from Dalhousie University, and his PhD in Medieval Studies from the University of Toronto.

References

Year of birth missing (living people)
Living people
Academic staff of York University
21st-century Canadian historians
University of Toronto alumni
Dalhousie University alumni
University of Victoria alumni